Levan Pantsulaia (born February 26, 1986) is a Georgian chess grandmaster.

Career
He has competed at a number of chess olympiads, including 2008, 2010 and 2016.

He played in the Chess World Cup 2017, and was knocked out by Jan-Krzysztof Duda in the first round.

External links

Living people
Chess grandmasters
Chess players from Georgia (country)
1986 births